The 1926–27 season was Stoke City's 27th season in the Football League and the first in the Third Division North.

With relegation last season Stoke found themselves playing in the bottom tier of the Football League the Third Division North. Whilst there was obvious disappointment of the clubs failures it soon became clear that an instant return to the Second Division would be achieved as Stoke proved to be too good for their league opponents and ended the season as champions with 63 points and an impressive goal average of 2.3.

Season review

League
After the trauma of two pretty bad seasons, there was to be a turn around in Stoke's fortunes in 1926–27 and from the outset there was never any doubt that promotion back to the Second Division would be achieved.

There had been reservations regarding the midfield, but manager Tom Mather gambled and switched Harry Sellars to right-half, brought in Cecil Eastwood from Preston North End to occupy left-half and slotted Tom Williamson between them. Thanks to the consistent form of this trio Stoke were on top of the league throughout the season, achieving ten doubles over their opponents. During the season a number of teams made their one and only trip to the Victoria Ground these were Ashington who were beaten 7–0, Durham City 4–0, Nelson 4–1, Wigan Borough 2–0 and New Brighton who managed a 1–1. In the return fixture against New Brighton Stoke produced what was easily their worst display of the season and crashed to a 5–0 defeat.

Stoke moved into April 1927 sitting on top of the table, but they were rocked by a 4–0 defeat to second place Rochdale. A 2–0 win over Tranmere Rovers eased the tensions but a 3–1 defeat at Doncaster Rovers on Good Friday put the celebrations on hold again, and although they beat Durham City 24 hours later, a goalless draw with Doncaster left Stoke with just a three-point lead over Rochdale. With three games remaining Stoke required four points to secure the title and with it promotion. However promotion was sealed in the next match against Accrington Stanley Stoke winning 1–0 thanks to a Jack Eyres goal and news that both Rochdale and Nelson had been beaten meant that Stoke took the title and returned to the Second Division at the first time of asking.

FA Cup
In the FA Cup Stoke were embarrassed as Welsh League side Rhyl Athletic took Stoke to a second replay before winning 2–1.

Final league table

Results
Stoke's score comes first

Legend

Football League Third Division North

FA Cup

Squad statistics

References

Stoke City F.C. seasons
Stoke